Cory McKenna (born 11 July 1999) is a Welsh professional mixed martial artist who competes as a strawweight for the Ultimate Fighting Championship. She has also competed for Cage Warriors.

Early life and background 
Born in Wales, McKenna spent the majority of her childhood in Colchester, England due to her father's role in the army. Her mother, Wendy, also competes in mixed martial arts and has a professional record of 1–2.

McKenna began training in karate aged 10, and after advancing through Muay Thai, Brazilian jiu-jitsu and boxing, started training in mixed martial arts aged 13. She became a full-time athlete two years later while occasionally coaching to help fund fights. As an amateur, McKenna went 7–0 and held championships at strawweight and featherweight.

Mixed martial arts career

Cage Warriors 
In March 2018, McKenna made her professional debut at Cage Warriors 91 and beat Maria Vittoria Colonna after a first-round retirement. She faced Eva Dourthe three months later at Cage Warriors 94 and won via split decision. In September 2018, McKenna suffered her first defeat after a split decision loss against Micol Di Segni at Cage Warriors 97.

In April 2019, McKenna faced Fannie Redman at Cage Warriors 104. She won the fight via rear naked choke in the second round. A month later, she beat Giulia Chinello at Cage Warriors 105 via ground and pound in the first round. In October 2019, McKenna was due to fight Griet Eeckhout at Cage Warriors 108, but the fight was cancelled after her opponent failed to make weight. In April 2020, her fight with Lanchana Green was also called off after Cage Warriors 114 was cancelled due to COVID-19 restrictions.

Dana White's Contender Series 
On 11 August 2020, McKenna appeared on Dana White's Contender Series 2020. After winning via unanimous decision against Vanessa Demopoulos, McKenna was awarded a UFC contract. The deal saw her became the first Welsh female and youngest ever British fighter to sign for the promotion.

Ultimate Fighting Championship
McKenna made her promotional debut against Kay Hansen on November 14, 2020, at UFC Fight Night: Felder vs. dos Anjos. She won the fight via unanimous decision.

In her sophomore performance, she faced Elise Reed on March 19, 2022, at UFC Fight Night: Volkov vs. Aspinall. She lost the fight via split decision.

McKenna faced Miranda Granger on August 6, 2022 at UFC on ESPN 40. She won the fight via a shoulder choke in round two.

McKenna faced Cheyanne Vlismas on December 17, 2022 at UFC Fight Night 216. She won the fight via unanimous decision.

Personal life 
McKenna is a keen painter and often shares her artwork on Instagram.She is currently dating her fellow fighter Hector "El Matador" Fajardo.

Mixed martial arts record

|-
|Win
|align=center|8–2
|Cheyanne Vlismas
|Decision (unanimous)
|UFC Fight Night: Cannonier vs. Strickland
| 
|align=center|3
|align=center|5:00
|Las Vegas, Nevada, United States
|
|-
|Win
|align=center|7–2
|Miranda Granger
|Submission (Von Flue choke)
|UFC on ESPN: Santos vs. Hill
|
|align=center| 2
|align=center|1:03
|Las Vegas, Nevada, United States
|
|-
|Loss
|align=center|6–2
|Elise Reed
|Decision (split)
|UFC Fight Night: Volkov vs. Aspinall
|
|align=center|3
|align=center|5:00
|London, England
|
|-
|Win
|align=center| 6–1
|Kay Hansen
|Decision (unanimous)
|UFC Fight Night: Felder vs. dos Anjos
|
|align=center| 3
|align=center| 5:00
|Las Vegas, Nevada, United States
|
|-
|Win
|align=center| 5–1
|Vanessa Demopoulos
|Decision (unanimous)
|Dana White's Contender Series 28
|
|align=center| 3
|align=center| 5:00
|Las Vegas, Nevada, United States
|
|-
|Win
|align=center| 4–1
|Giulia Chinello
|TKO (punches)
|Cage Warriors 105
|
|align=center| 1
|align=center| 2:15
|Colchester, England
|
|-
|Win
|align=center| 3–1
|Fannie Redman
|Submission (rear-naked choke)
|Cage Warriors 104
|
|align=center| 2
|align=center| 2:06
|Cardiff, Wales
|
|-
|Loss
|align=center| 2–1
|Micol Di Segni
|Decision (split)
|Cage Warriors 97
|
|align=center| 3
|align=center| 5:00
|Cardiff, Wales
|
|-
|Win
|align=center| 2–0
|Eva Dourthe
|Decision (split)
|Cage Warriors 94
|
|align=center| 3
|align=center| 5:00
|Antwerp, Belgium
|
|-
|Win
|align=center| 1–0
|Maria Vittoria Colonna
|TKO (corner stoppage)
|Cage Warriors 91
|
|align=center| 1
|align=center| 5:00
|Newport, Wales
|
|-

See also
 List of current UFC fighters
 List of female mixed martial artists

References

External links
 
 

1999 births
Sportspeople from Cwmbran
Living people
Welsh female mixed martial artists
Strawweight mixed martial artists
Mixed martial artists utilizing Muay Thai
Mixed martial artists utilizing karate
Mixed martial artists utilizing boxing
Mixed martial artists utilizing Brazilian jiu-jitsu
Martial artists from Liverpool
Welsh Muay Thai practitioners
Female Muay Thai practitioners
British female karateka
Welsh practitioners of Brazilian jiu-jitsu
Female Brazilian jiu-jitsu practitioners
Ultimate Fighting Championship female fighters